The BAR 005 was a Formula One car which the British American Racing team used to compete in the 2003 Formula One season. The car was driven by Jacques Villeneuve and Jenson Button, the former being replaced by test driver Takuma Sato for the last race of the season. The team finished fifth in the Constructors' Championship with 26 points.

BAR used 'Lucky Strike' logos, except at the French, British and United States Grands Prix.

BAR 04 
During the 2003-2004 offseason, BAR used the 04 Concept Car, a modified version of the 005, notably featuring a black and gray livery and the Honda RA004E engine from the following season.

Complete Formula One results
(key) (results in bold indicate pole position)

External links

References

2003 Formula One season cars
BAR Formula One cars